Ghulam Qawis Abubaker was the governor of Kapisa, Afghanistan. He succeeded Abdul Sattar Murad, who was dismissed after critical comments in Newsweek regarding the central government's ineffectiveness in remote areas of the province.

During his term as Governor he put much effort into assuring the reconstruction of the Kapisa Province.

Notes

Living people
Year of birth missing (living people)
Governors of Kapisa Province